Slow Crimes is a 1982 studio album by English post-punk rock group the Work. It is their debut album and was recorded between September 1981 – January 1982 in London, Switzerland and Belgium. It was released on LP in April 1982 by Woof Records in the United Kingdom, and follows on from "I Hate America" / "Fingers & Toes" / "Duty", their first single recorded and released in 1981.

Slow Crimes was reissued in 1992 on CD by Megaphone Records in the United States with four extra tracks: the three tracks from the band's first single, plus "Houdini", originally released in 1982 on the Recommended Records Sampler.

Reception

In a review in AllMusic, Rick Anderson described Slow Crimes as avant-garde in a "very distinctively British way". He said Tim Hodgkinson's "warbly, watery, unsteady" vocals define the album's mood, while Catherine Jauniaux's voice is "good, squeaky fun". Anderson liked "Balance" with its "frenetic polka-like punkiness", and called "Brickyards "exploration of multi-layered percussion and guitar sounds" the best track. Anderson was critical of some of the other tracks, calling "Flies" and "State Room" "rather boring [and] aimless". He also felt that what the Work did here had already been done, and better, by Hodgkinson's former band Henry Cow.

In a more positive review in All About Jazz, Nic Jones noted punk rock's influence on the album. He complimented the "[s]onic extremism and genetically modified funk" on "State Room" and "Do It", stating that "rarely have [they] been brought together so effectively". Jones added that "Le Travail" evokes the atmosphere of Henry Cow's Western Culture, and "Pop" suggests "some kind of interface" between the Work and British post-punk band the Slits.

Reviewing Slow Crimes in Record Collector, Tim Peacock wrote that just as Henry Cow operated outside the confines of rock music, the Work have done the same on this album, making it "a punishing listening experience". He felt that while the "prowling, angular" "Cain & Abel" and the "atmospheric" "Le Travail" "rise above the morass", the rest of the album suffers from the group's "ill-disciplined art-pop leanings".

Track listing

1982 LP release
All tracks composed by the Work.

Sources: Liner notes, Discogs.

1992 CD release bonus tracks
All tracks composed by the Work.

Sources: Liner notes, Discogs.

Personnel
Bill Gilonis – guitar, bass guitar, euphonium, Jew's harp, vocals
 Mick Hobbs – bass guitar, guitar, drums, recorder, ukulele, vocals
Tim Hodgkinson – Hawaiian guitar, saxophone, keyboards, vocals
Rick Wilson – bass guitar, drums, vocals

Guests
Catherine Jauniaux – vocals (tracks 3,7,11,12)

Sources: Liner notes, Discogs.

Sound and artwork
Tracks 1, 4, 6, 10–12 recorded and mixed at Cold Storage Studios, London
Engineer – Peter Bullen
Additional engineering – Charles Bullen
Tracks 3, 7–9 recorded and mixed at Surrey Sound Studios, Leatherhead, London
Engineer – Chris Gray
Tracks 2, 5, 16 recorded and mixed at Sunrise Studios, Kirchberg, Switzerland
Engineer – Etienne Conod
Additional engineering – Bubu Steiner
Track 3 (first part) recorded and mixed at 50 Rue De Rittweger, Brussels, Belgium
Engineer – Maggie Thomas
Tracks 13–15 recorded and mixed at Rossiter Rd, London
Engineer – The Work
Production – The Work
Cover art – Mick Hobbs

Sources: Liner notes, Discogs.

References

1982 debut albums
The Work (band) albums